Giannis Aggelakas (Greek: Γιάννης Αγγελάκας) is a Greek singer, songwriter, and poet. Best known as the former lead singer of the Greek rock band Trypes, he maintains a productive solo career since 2000 having experimented with Greek folk music and collaborated with artists like Thanassis Papakonstantinou and Psarantonis. From 2004 onwards, he maintains his own record label, All together Now releasing his personal albums from there.

Discography
For Giannis Aggelakas' releases with the rock group Trypes, see Trypes#Discography

1993 Υπέροχο τίποτα (Beautiful Nothing), (Virgin)
2000 Χώμα & νερό (Earth & Water)
2003 Ο χαμένος τα παίρνει όλα (The Loser Takes It All) (soundtrack), Hitch Hyke Records, All Together Now (reissue)
2005 Οι ανάσες των λύκων (The Breaths of the wolves), All Together Now
2005 Από 'δω και πάνω (From now on), All Together Now
2007 Πότε θα φτάσουμε εδώ (When are we getting here), All Together Now
2009 Ψυχή Βαθιά (Soul Deep), (soundtrack) All Together Now
2013 Η Γελαστή Ανηφόρα (The smiling uphill), All Together Now

References

1959 births
Living people
Greek male songwriters
20th-century Greek male singers
21st-century Greek male singers
Musicians from Thessaloniki